Cucurbalsaminol may refer to either of two chemical compounds:

 Cucurbalsaminol A
 Cucurbalsaminol B